Mathias John Zeiser (sometimes spelled Zieser) (September 25, 1888 – June 10, 1942) was a professional baseball pitcher. He appeared in two games in Major League Baseball for the Boston Red Sox during the 1914 season, both as a relief pitcher. Zeiser batted and threw right-handed. He was born and died in Chicago, Illinois.

In a two-game career, Zeiser posted a 1.80 earned run average with eight walks in 10 innings pitched.

External links

Baseball Almanac

Major League Baseball pitchers
Boston Red Sox players
Lowell Grays players
Scranton Miners players
Chillicothe Babes players
Huntington Babes players
Maysville Angels players
Ironton Nailers players
South Bend Benders players
Bloomington Bloomers players
Evansville Evas players
Terre Haute Tots players
Rockford Rox players
1888 births
1942 deaths
Baseball players from Chicago